Schistostega pennata, also called goblin gold, Dragon's gold, luminous moss or luminescent moss, is a haplolepideous moss (Dicranidae) known for its glowing appearance in dark places.  It is the only member of the family Schistostegaceae.

Description
The moss has adapted to grow in low light conditions by utilizing spherical cells in the protonema that act as lenses, collecting and concentrating even the faintest light. The chloroplasts absorb the useful wavelengths of the light and reflect back the remainder towards the light source, giving the moss a greenish-gold glow. The little lenses have the capability of turning towards the light source to maximise the collection of available light.

The fronds of shoots that develop from the persistent protonema are small (1.5 cm long) with opposing pairs of leaves. A long stalk holds the egg-shaped capsule aloft.

Distribution
Schistostega pennata is found in China, Japan, Siberia, Europe, and North America.

It is easily outcompeted by other mosses and plant species in open, brighter areas, but its ability to concentrate the available light allows it to grow in shady places where other plants cannot survive. It prefers damp, but not too wet, mineral soils with a source of dim light, such as reflection from a pool of water, and so grows in habitats such as overturned tree roots, entrances to animal burrows and caves.

Folklore

Concerning the moss's common names, such as "goblin gold", Austrian Botanist, Anton Kerner von Marilaun wrote in  Das Pflanzenleben der Donauländer in 1863:

There is a monument to Schistostega in Hokkaido, Japan, where it grows in profusion in a tiny cave.

References

External links

 Photo from Olympic National Park (click to enlarge) Close-up
 Scientific illustration
Photos by Matt Goff

Dicranales
Flora of Asia
Flora of Europe
Flora of North America
Monotypic moss genera